Josh Whitman (born August 5, 1978) is a university administrator, a lawyer, and a former American football player. He is currently the athletic director at the University of Illinois at Urbana–Champaign. Whitman served as the athletic director at University of Wisconsin–La Crosse from 2011 to 2014, and Washington University in St. Louis from 2014 to 2016.

Education and early career
Whitman graduated from Harrison High School in West Lafayette, Indiana in 1997.
He played tight end at Illinois from 1997–2000 under head coach Ron Turner. Whitman graduated from Illinois in 2001 as a bronze tablet scholar with his B.S degree in finance. In 2004, he retired from the NFL and enrolled in the University of Illinois College of Law. As a law student, Whitman spent time as a law clerk for Michael P. McCuskey and Michael Stephen Kanne, both of whom are United States federal judges. From 2005–2008 Whitman also worked in the Illinois athletic department as a special assistant to athletic director Ron Guenther. After receiving his J.D. degree summa cum laude in 2008, Whitman took a job in Washington D.C. working as an attorney for Covington & Burling, which serves as outside legal counsel for the NFL.

Athletic administration career
In 2010, Whitman was hired as the athletic director for NCAA Division III Wisconsin–La Crosse. While Whitman was at Wisconsin–La Crosse, Eagles teams won four national championships and 21 conference titles. Whitman was later named athletic director of Washington University in St. Louis in 2014.

In 2016, Whitman was hired as the 14th athletic director for the University of Illinois. During his time at Illinois; Whitman has fired Bill Cubit, Lovie Smith, and John Groce and also has hired Lovie Smith, Brad Underwood, and Bret Bielema during his tenure. Other notable hires and contract extensions include Mike Small, Chris Tamas, and Dan Hartleb.

References

External links
 Illinois profile
 Washington University profile

1978 births
Living people
Buffalo Bills players
Frankfurt Galaxy players
Illinois Fighting Illini athletic directors
Illinois Fighting Illini football players
Miami Dolphins players
People from West Lafayette, Indiana
Players of American football from Indiana
San Diego Chargers players
Seattle Seahawks players
American football tight ends
Lawyers from Washington, D.C.
Washington University Bears athletic directors
Wisconsin–La Crosse Eagles athletic directors
People associated with Covington & Burling
University of Illinois College of Law alumni